The Hispano Aviación HA-1109 and HA-1112 are licence-built versions of the Messerschmitt Bf 109G-2 developed in Spain during and after World War II.

Design and development

In 1942, the Spanish government arranged a manufacturing licence with Messerschmitt AG to build the Bf 109G-2, although the DB 605A engines, propellers, instruments and weapons were to be supplied from Germany. This proved impossible as Germany was incapable of meeting its own needs, let alone Spain's, and only 25 airframes (without their tails) and less than half the necessary drawings were actually delivered. Consequently, Hispano Aviación replaced the DB 605A engine with the 1,300 hp HS 89-12Z and the project was renamed Bf 109J by Messerschmitt. The HS 89-12Z engine performed a successful flight in a Bf 109E used as a flying testbed in Barcelona in 1944, and the first HA-1109-J1L made its maiden flight on 2 March 1945 in Seville, using a VDM propeller and lash-up engine mounting. The remaining 24 airframes were flown during 1947–9 with Escher-Wyss props, but never became operational.

In May 1951, a developed version, the HA-1112-K1L, improved the Hispano-Suiza, HS 17-12Z engine installation, and carried either one or two 12.7mm Breda machine guns and Pilatus eight-packs of 80mm rockets. Its three-bladed de Havilland Hydromatic propeller earned it the nickname Tripala ("three blades").

It first flew in 1951, and although 200 were planned only 65 were built. The Hispano engine was an upright V12 instead of the inverted V12 Daimler-Benz DB 601 & 605 engines used in the Bf 109 but, being of compact design, it fitted the airframe of the Bf 109 well and was able to credibly represent the Bf 109 in the German 1957 film Der Stern von Afrika (The Star of Africa) about Luftwaffe ace Hans-Joachim Marseille. The original design, starting with the Bf 109F, had an asymmetrical tail-fin aerofoil with a left deflection to counteract the torque from the Daimler-Benz's clockwise rotation. Because this was left unchanged in the Buchón despite the Hispano V12 having a counter-clockwise rotation, the tail and the engine together induced a right swing on takeoff that was hard to counteract.

A second version, the HA-1110-K1L, was a two-place tandem trainer model.

HA-1112-M1L

The final variant was the HA-1112-M1L Buchón (Pouter), which is a male dove in Spanish. It first flew on 29 March 1954 with a 1,600 hp Rolls-Royce Merlin 500-45 engine and Rotol propeller, both purchased as surplus from the UK. This engine had a chin intake that altered the lines of the Bf 109's airframe. It was an improvised assembly of outdated components but this was appropriate for the intended purpose of controlling Spanish colonial territories in Africa, where more sophisticated technology was both unnecessary and unavailable in isolated Spain at the time. It carried two 20 mm Hispano-Suiza 404/408 cannons and two Oerlikon or Pilatus eight-packs of 80 mm rockets and remained in service until 27 December 1965.

In film

Due to their longevity, Buchóns have appeared in several war films masquerading as Bf 109Es and Gs. in movies such as Battle of Britain (alongside CASA 2.111 bombers, a Spanish-built version of the Heinkel He 111), Der Stern von Afrika, Memphis Belle, Dunkirk, and The Tuskegee Airmen. Buchons also played the Bf 109's opposition, the Hawker Hurricane, in one scene in Battle of Britain.

Variants

HA-1109-J1L
1945the initial 25 units built of the Bf 109 G-2 aircraft, from German production, with Hispano-Suiza 12Z-89 engines fitted, in lieu of Daimler-Benz DB 605A's, using VDM or Escher-Wyss propellers. Not used operationally.

HA-1109-K1L
1951first production of HA-1112-K1L. Fitted with a Hispano-Suiza 12Z-17 engine and a de Havilland Hydromatic propeller in an improved installation, this version appeared in May 1951 armed with two Hispano HS-404 20mm cannon and 80mm rockets. 25 conversions from a HA-1109-J1L.

HA-1109-M1L
prototype of HA-1112-M1L. A single aircraft modified with a Rolls-Royce Merlin 500-45 engine. One conversion from a HA-1112-K1L.

HA-1110-K1L
Hispano powered two-seat trainer version. Used operationally. One built.

HA-1110-M1L
RR Merlin powered two-seat trainer version. Project only.

HA-1111-K1L
Hispano powered two-seat trainer version with wingtip mounted fuel tanks. Project only.

HA-1112-K1L "Tripala"
1951used operationally. 65 built (25 conversions from a HA-1109-K1L).

HA-1112-M1L "Buchon"
1954the final variant fitted with a RR Merlin engine and armed with two Hispano HS-404 20mm cannon and 80mm rockets. Used operationally. 172 built.

HA-1112-M4L
Merlin engined two-seat trainer. Used operationally. One built and one conversion from a HA-1110-K1L.

Aircraft on display

 56 – HA-1112-K1L on static display at the Museo del Aire in Madrid.
 67 – HA-1112-M1L airworthy with Spitfire Ltd. of St. Helier, Jersey.
 133 – HA-1112-M1L airworthy at the Military Aviation Museum in Virginia Beach, Virginia. It has been converted to resemble a Bf 109 by Meier Motors.
 164 – HA-1112-M1L in storage at the Canada Aviation and Space Museum in Ottawa, Ontario.
 171 – HA-1112-M1L on static display at the Air Zoo in Portage, Michigan.
 186 – HA-1112-M1L on static display at the Museum of Flight in Seattle, Washington.
 193 – HA-1112-M1L airworthy at the Erickson Aircraft Collection in Madras, Oregon. It was restored to resemble a Bf 109 by Pacific Fighters.
 199 – HA-1112-M1L on static display at the EAA AirVenture Museum in Oshkosh, Wisconsin.
 211 – HA-1112-M1L on static display at the Museo del Aire in Madrid.
 235 – HA-1112-M1L airworthy at the Cavanaugh Flight Museum in Addison, Texas.

Specifications (HA-1112-K1L)

See also

References

Notes

Sources 
 Original pictures and data of this article were taken from Museo del Aire, Cuatro Vientos, Madrid, Spain
 Fitzsimons, Bernard, ed. Illustrated Encyclopedia of 20th Century Weapons and Warfare (London: Phoebus, 1978), Volume 11, p. 1193-4, "HA-1109/1112".
 http://simviation.com/fsdcbainmm.htm
 https://web.archive.org/web/20081016094929/http://www.xs4all.nl/~tozu/me109/foreign/109-spain.htm
 Monográficos Aéreos: H.A. 1112-M1L "Buchón" - Pedro Miguel Paniagua Magán -

External links

Hispano HA-1109

Hispano aircraft
1950s Spanish fighter aircraft
Single-engined tractor aircraft
Low-wing aircraft
History of the Spanish Air Force
Messerschmitt Bf 109
Aircraft first flown in 1954
Retractable conventional landing gear